The phalanx is a rectangular mass military formation.

Phalanx may also refer to:

Military
 Phalanx CIWS, a U.S. Navy defense system to protect against an anti-ship missile
 Royal Phalanx, a special military unit formed of veterans of the Greek War of Independence

Politics
 North American Phalanx, a utopian community in New Jersey, organized on proto-communist Fourierist principles, or its journal The Phalanx
 The Spanish Falange
Falangism, ideology of the above 
 Falanga National Radical Camp/RNR-Falanga/ONR-Falanga - Polish extreme right party  
 The Lebanese Kataeb Party

Places
Phalanx, New Jersey, an unincorporated area within Colts Neck Township, New Jersey
Phalanx, Ohio, an unincorporated community
Phalanx Mountain, a summit in British Columbia

Arts and literature
 Phalanx (art group), an artistic movement formed in Munich in 1901
 Phalanx (comics), a species of villainous mechanical aliens in Marvel Comics
 The Phalanx, a Fourierist journal
Phalanx, a journal published by the Military Operations Research Society
 Phalanx, the name of the false zombie proof drug in the novel by Max Brooks, World War Z
 The Phalanx Nations, a terrorist organization in the young adult novel, The Prophet of Yonwood
 Phalanx, a 2012 Warhammer 40,000 novel

Music
 Phalanx (album), a 1983 live album by Australian surf rock band, Australian Crawl
 Phalanx, a trance music group formed by Dennis Gertner, DJ Manian, and Manuel Schleis
 Phalanx (band), a jazz music group

Medicine
 Phalanx bone, the bones that form fingers and toes

Video games
 The fictional secret anti-alien invasion force the player commands in the fanmade UFO: Alien Invasion game, an open-source project in the X-COM tradition.
 Phalanx (video game), a Super NES and Game Boy Advance video game
 The 13th Colossus from the video game Shadow of the Colossus
 The first Demon (boss) in the PS3 game Demon's Souls
 The nemesis of the protagonist in the Super NES game Demon's Crest
 A Cabal enemy type from the video game Destiny

Other uses
 Phalanx (mythology), a figure in Greek mythology
 Phalanx (honor society), the seniors honor society at Rensselaer Polytechnic Institute. There is a similarly named society at Clarkson University. 
 Phalanstère, a building layout developed by utopian socialist Charles Fourier
 Phalanx (horse), American Champion racehorse
 The falanges (legions of spirits) of the Brazilian Umbanda religion
 Phalanx Family Ties, a street family in Law & Order: Special Victims Unit